The 1993–94 season was Paris Saint-Germain's 24th season in existence. PSG played their home league games at the Parc des Princes in Paris, registering an average attendance of 26,521 spectators per match. The club was presided by Michel Denisot and the team was coached by Artur Jorge. Paul Le Guen was the team captain.

Summary

Brazilian playmaker Raí, considered by many as PSG's greatest player ever, joined the capital club in 1993–94, helping them conquer their second league title. The Parisians went a remarkable 27 matches without defeat, breaking the Division 1 record set by themselves in 1985–86. PSG also recorded their largest victory ever in all competitions after hammering amateur side Côte Chaude in the last-64 round of the Coupe de France in January 1994 (10–0). The club's league-cup double aspirations were, however, cut short by Lens in the quarterfinals.

In Europe, history would repeat itself. The Red and Blues beat Real Madrid in the European Cup Winners' Cup quarterfinals, becoming in the process the first and, so far, only French team to win at the Bernabéu with a solitary goal from George Weah, but were denied at the gates of the final once again. Having drawn 1–1 at home to Arsenal, PSG needed to score in London yet, surprisingly, Artur Jorge decided to leave Weah in the stands, from where he watched his team lose (0–1). This defeat marked the end of Jorge and his conservative style of play. In his place, the club welcomed Luis Fernandez, who would guide PSG to one of the best campaigns in their history.

Players 
As of the 1993–94 season.

Squad

Out on loan

Transfers 

As of the 1993–94 season.

Arrivals

Departures

Kits 

American electronics manufacturer Commodore, French soft-drink brand Tourtel and Spanish car manufacturer SEAT were the shirt sponsors. American sportswear brand Nike was the kit manufacturer.

Friendly tournaments

Tournoi de Paris

Coupe d'Été

First round (Group Center)

Competitions

Overview

Division 1

League table

Results by round

Matches

Coupe de France

European Cup Winners' Cup

First round

Second round

Quarter-finals

Semi-finals

Statistics 

As of the 1993–94 season.

Appearances and goals 

|-
!colspan="16" style="background:#dcdcdc; text-align:center"|Goalkeepers

|-
!colspan="16" style="background:#dcdcdc; text-align:center"|Defenders

|-
!colspan="16" style="background:#dcdcdc; text-align:center"|Midfielders

|-
!colspan="16" style="background:#dcdcdc; text-align:center"|Forwards

|-

References

External links 

Official websites
 PSG.FR - Site officiel du Paris Saint-Germain
 Paris Saint-Germain - Ligue 1 
 Paris Saint-Germain - UEFA.com

Paris Saint-Germain F.C. seasons
Paris Saint-Germain
French football championship-winning seasons